Go Go Live at the Capital Centre was a concert performance by various prominent go-go bands and hip-hop artists based in the Washington metropolitan area. It was recorded live in October 1987 at the Capital Centre (a defunct indoor arena in Landover, Maryland). The double–cassette was released by "I Hear Ya Records" on December 18, 1987, and the video recording was released on VHS-tape by "G Street Express" on the same day.

The concert was a sold-out event with over 24,000 concert-goers in attendance. This concert also marked the first time an all go-go lineup exclusively headlined an event at the Capital Center.

Track listing

References

External links
 Go Go Live at the Capital Centre at Discogs.com

1987 live albums
Go-go albums
Concert films
Culture of Washington, D.C.
Live video albums